Annette Mirjam Böckler (born June 26, 1966) is a German scholar of Judaism, who worked as librarian at Leo Baeck College in London, and a writer and translator in the Jewish subject area. She briefly held a post with ZIID in Zurich (institute for interreligious dialogue). She is one of the translators of Seder haTefillot, the first liberal Jewish prayerbook after the Shoah in Germany, and the translator and editor of the German edition of the W. Gunther Plaut's Torah commentary.

She studied Protestant Theology, Bible, and Ancient Near Eastern Studies in Tübingen, Bern, Bonn and Cologne and concluded her studies in 1993 with the first ecclesiastical exam, after which she was admitted as vicar in training on the churches' preparatory employment scheme. In March 1995 she passed the second ecclesiastical exam of the Evangelical Church in the Rhineland. In 1996 she was admitted to the church's auxiliary service as pastor. On 2 February 1997 she was ordained as a minister of the Evangelical Church of the Rhineland in the community of Unterbarmen-Mitte (Wuppertal, Germany). Until September 1998 she worked primarily at the Kirchliche Hochschule Wuppertal. On 1 October 1998 she was discharged from ecclesiastical service (last position "pastor on probational service"). In February 2000 she did a doctorate in the field of Old Testament on "God as father" (Guetersloh, 2nd edition, 2002). In 2001 she converted to Judaism.

From 2000 until 2002 she was an editorial consultant at the Berlin branch of the Juedische Verlagsanstalt Berlin. From 2003 until 2004 she was a member of the teaching staff at the Abraham-Geiger-Kolleg rabbinical seminary in Potsdam. In 2004 she took up a post as research associate for Bible and Jewish exegesis at the Hochschule für Jüdische Studien in Heidelberg which she held until 2007. Her fields of research are literary analysis of Bible texts and the reception of the Bible in Jewish liturgy.

She is one of the translators of the Jewish liberal prayerbook "Seder haTefillot" (Guetersloh, 1997). She also translated and edited Rabbi W. Gunther Plaut's Torah commentary (Guetersloh 1999–2004). She was one of the editors of the annual German Jewish calendar "Durch das juedische Jahr" before Irith Michelsohn (Author), Paul Yuval Adam (Author) and Alexander Lyskovoy (Author). This calendar has been published by the Juedische Verlagsansstalt Berlin since 2001, .

Selected bibliography
 Die Weisheit des Judentums. Gedanken für jeden Tag des Jahres (The Wisdom of the Jews. Thoughts for Each Day of the Year), by Walter Homolka and Annette Böckler, Gütersloh 1999, 
 Jüdischer Gottesdienst: Wesen und Struktur (Jewish Worship Service: Nature and Structure), Berlin: Jüdische Verlagsanstalt, 2000, .
 Sprüche der Väter; Pirke Awot (Sayings of the Fathers; Pirkei Avoth), with Gunther Plaut, Jüdische Verlagsanstalt Berlin, 2001, .
 Durch das jüdische Jahr (The Jewish Year), calendar/day planner, published annually since 2001. 5765 (2004–2005) edition .
 Gott als Vater im Alten Testament: Traditionsgeschichtliche Untersuchungen zur Entstehung und Entwicklung eines Gottesbildes, (God as Father in the Old Testament) Gütersloh: Gütersloher Verlagshaus 2. 2002 (472 Seiten), .
 Birkat ha-Mason; Tischdank (Birkat Hamazon; Grace After Meals), with Walter Homolka, Jüdische Verlagsanstalt Berlin, 2002, 
 Die Tora: Die fünf Bücher Moses nach der Übersetzung von Moses Mendelssohn. Mit den Prophetenlesungen im Anhang. (The Torah: The Five Books of Moses in the Translation of Moses Mendelsohn) edited and revised by Annette M. Böckler, 3. Aufl. Berlin: Jüdische Verlagsanstalt 2004, .

External links
Böckler's home page

1966 births
Living people
Judaic scholars
Jewish historians
German Reform Jews
People from Remscheid
People associated with Leo Baeck College
Converts to Judaism from Protestantism
German Protestant clergy
Women Christian clergy
Converts to Reform Judaism
Jewish women